Right First Time is the debut album by New Zealand band Th' Dudes. The New Zealand version was released in May 1979, and the Australian version six months later in November. The single "Be Mine Tonight" is considered one of the greats in New Zealand songwriting.

Track listing

Personnel
 Bass – Lez White  (replaced Peter Coleman)
 Design – Peter Urlich
 Drums – Bruce Hambling
 Engineer – Denis Odlin
 Guitar, keyboards, vocals, mixed by – Ian Morris
 Guitar, vocals – Dave Dobbyn
 Producer – Robert Charles Aickin*
 Vocals – Peter Urlich
 Written-By – Dobbyn*, Morris*

Liner notes 
Recorded at Stebbing Studios, Auckland. 
Published by and copyright owned by Big Mouth Records, Inc., Australia

Alternate cover
The Australian release of the album had a green-tinted cover. The band were not impressed.

Charts

References

Th' Dudes albums
1979 debut albums